Shimano Pedaling Dynamics, commonly called SPD, is a design of clipless bicycle pedals and associated cleats first released by Shimano in 1990. The first model, PD-M737, was aimed at mountain biking enthusiasts who, prior to this, had to use toe clips and straps or "road" clipless pedals which clogged with mud and made walking very difficult in unrideable situations.

Shimano makes a number of different SPD-type cleats, and not all cleats are compatible with all pedals, mainly between the recessed metal "mountain" (SPD) [2-Bolt] line and the protruding plastic "road" (SPD-SL) [3-Bolt] (a.k.a. "LOOK") line.

As for SPD cleats, there is an important distinction between SPD black "single release" cleats (SM-SH51) and silver "multi release" cleats (SM-SH56).  The former can only be released from the pedal by twisting the heel directly sideward, while the latter can be released twisting the heel in 'any direction' (sideward and upward) and are therefore easier to learn/use for novices to clipless pedals. 

And as for SPD-SL cleats, they operate closer to the "single release" SPD cleats, in that that they release with more sideward force. The SPD-SL cleats are offered in three different 'float' options: Yellow - 6 degrees [like SPD] (SM-SH11), Blue - 2 degrees (SM-SH12), Red - 0 degrees [fixed] (SM-SH10). Yellow, one of the original offerings is the most popular option. Blue, the newest, offers a middle ground in float. SPD-SL pedals offer a larger contact area than SPD for long road rides, at the expense of ease of walking.

Both SPD and SPD-SL have a small adjustment screw (per side on dual-side SPD) on the pedal that can be used to alter the resistance required to release the cleat from the pedal, so beginners can have it 'soft' and easy to get out, and then tighten it up as they progress.

References

Bicycle parts